Filozofia is an academic journal of philosophy published by the Slovak Academy of Sciences. It publishes articles in Slovak, Czech, and English. The journal's scope includes metaphysics, epistemology, history of philosophy, social philosophy, philosophy of mind, ethics, philosophy of religion, and related disciplines. The journal publishes 10 issues a year (each month, with the exception of July and August).  The editor-in-chief is Dagmar Smreková.

Papers published in Filozofia are indexed in the Arts and Humanities Citation Index and Research Alert.

External links 
 

Philosophy journals
Multilingual journals
Monthly journals